Brooke Levi Vincent (born 4 June 1992) is an English actress, known for her portrayal of Sophie Webster in the ITV soap-opera Coronation Street, which she played from 2004 to 2019.

Early life
Vincent was born in Audenshaw, Greater Manchester, England to Nicola Anderton, a crime scene officer for Greater Manchester Police and Anthony Vincent, a tour guide in Tenerife; her parents divorced when she was two and she was raised by her mother and stepfather, John McDermott. Vincent has a paternal older half-brother, Zak, and a younger maternal half-sister, Maisie. Vincent attended Fairfield High School for Girls in Droylsden and The Manchester College, where she gained a National Diploma in Acting.

Career 
Vincent's first television appearance was as a guest character, Casey Emma Glass, in the TV series, The League of Gentlemen. Shortly after landing the role of Sophie in Coronation Street, she appeared on Children in Need. In 2018, Vincent competed in the tenth series of Dancing on Ice, and finished in second place, alongside professional partner Matej Silecky.

Coronation Street 
Vincent joined long-running British soap-opera Coronation Street in April 2004 as the third actress to play Sophie Webster, replacing Emma Woodward who decided to leave the soap at the end of 2003. Vincent's first appearance was shown on 12 May. 

In an interview on 7 September 2010 with Vincent and Sacha Parkinson, both young actresses discussed their roles in the lesbian storyline, whereby, their relationship transformed from best friends to girlfriends, with the realisation of their sexuality. This storyline on Coronation Street started on 11 April 2010. On 5 November 2010 at the "Stonewall Awards" ceremony, Coronation Street won the new "Broadcast of the Year" award, in recognition of its gay storylines. Vincent was nominated for the award for Best Dramatic Performance from a Young Actor or Actress for her portrayal of Sophie at The British Soap Awards 2008. At the 2008 Inside Soap Awards, Vincent was nominated in the category "Best Young Actor". In October 2019 Vincent took maternity leave from the show but will be returning.

Other ventures 
In 2018, Vincent launched her own stationery brand, Oh So B; her first three planners were named after her half-sister and her cousins.

Personal life 
Vincent is the cousin of Ellie Leach, fellow Coronation Street actress who plays Faye Windass; Vincent was said to be "overjoyed" by Leach's casting in the soap.
She has been in a relationship with footballer Kean Bryan since 2016, the couple have two sons.

In 2018, Vincent revealed that she had quit smoking after ten years.  In April 2019, Vincent announced that she was pregnant with her first child. On 23 October 2019, Vincent gave birth to a baby boy named Mexx S J Bryan. In November 2020, Vincent announced she was pregnant with her second child. On 4 May 2021, Vincent gave birth to her second son named Monroe S J Bryan.

Filmography

Television

Film

References

External links 
 

1992 births
English child actresses
English soap opera actresses
Living people
People from Denton, Greater Manchester
Actresses from Greater Manchester
Actresses from Lancashire
English television actresses
21st-century English actresses
Alumni of The Manchester College